Noáin is a municipality in Navarre, Spain. The main settlement is Noáin, a suburb in the southern part of the Pamplona metropolitan area and with many industrial parks. The municipality comprises also several rural villages. Pamplona Airport is located in Noáin.

Geography
Noáin (6,621 inhabitants in the village) counts 10 hamlets (núcleos de población):

Gallery

References

External links

  Noáin official website
  Noáin (Valle de Elroz) - Noain  (Elortzibar) in the Bernardo Estornés Lasa - Auñamendi Encyclopedia (Euskomedia Fundazioa)

Municipalities in Navarre